Henry Saari (born 14 January 1964, in Pori, Finland), also known as Henry the Great (Henry Suuri) is a Finnish actor, director and porn star. In 1993, Saari won the title of Mr. Finland and placed 3rd in the Mr. Europe contest.  He is known colloquially in Spanish-speaking countries as “El Cinturonero de Finland.”

Saari is best known for the five eponymous Henry the Great movies he directed and starred in between 1998 and 2001.  Aside from his pornographic work, Saari had parts in the Hollywood movie History Is Made at Night (1999) and the mainstream Finnish movies Young Gods (2003) and Bunny the Killer Thing (2015).

References

External links
 

1964 births
Living people
People from Pori
Finnish male pornographic film actors
Male beauty pageant winners
Finnish beauty pageant winners